The Polish Aviation Museum is a large museum of historic aircraft and aircraft engines in Kraków, Poland. It is located at the site of the no-longer functional Kraków-Rakowice-Czyżyny Airport.  This airfield, established by Austria-Hungary in 1912, is one of the oldest in the world.  The museum opened in 1964, after the airfield closed in 1963. Has been scored as eighth world's best aviation museum by CNN.

For the first half century of its existence the museum used four hangars of the former airfield to display its exhibits.  These buildings were not originally designed for this purpose and suffered from various inadequacies, notably insufficient heating in winter. The situation improved when a new main building for the museum opened on 18 September 2010.

Collection
The collection consists of over 200 aircraft as of 2005. Several of the aircraft displayed are unique on the world scale, including sailplanes and some 100 aircraft engines. Some of the exhibits are only in their initial stages. The museum houses a large aviation library and photographic archives.

The museum has 22 extremely rare airplanes that until 1941 were displayed at the Deutsche Luftfahrtsammlung museum (German aviation museum) in Berlin.  These planes were evacuated during World War II to rescue them from Allied bombing (the museum itself was destroyed in air raids) to German-occupied Poland. The German Museum of Technology in Berlin regards these exhibits as their property. The restitution demand is especially directed to those of great significance to German aviation history.  As of 2009 however, there was no sign that this would happen in the foreseeable future. Given the scale of destruction caused by German occupation in Poland between 1939-1945 and the recent German unwillingness to discuss reparation payments for Poland, it is likely this collection will remain in Polish hands.

The museum has very few Polish planes from the years 1918-1939, as these were almost all destroyed during the Nazi German occupation of Poland, including those  displayed in Polish pre-war aviation museums.  The only two examples of prewar Polish military aircraft in the collection: a PZL P.11 (the only surviving example in the world) and a PWS-26, survived only because they were displayed as war trophies by the Germans, and so were part of the above-mentioned collection acquired after the war.  In addition, a few Polish pre-war civilian planes were returned by Romania after the war and eventually found their way to the museum.

In contrast, the museum has an essentially complete collection of all airplane types developed or used by Poland after 1945.

Book imprint 
The Museum also functions as a publishing venue, in particular for dozens of books, photo albums, memoirs and brochures devoted to aviation history, including the subject of Polish design and manufacture of aircraft from before the invasion of Poland in 1939 and the post-1945 to the 1960s eras. Among its more popular books are the histories of 16 Polish squadrons in the Royal Air Force (RAF) during the Battle of Britain and the fight for Poland's independence during the First World War.

Fixed-wing motorized aircraft

The Museum also possesses some other incomplete aircraft and some stored.

Gliders

More gliders in temporary storage.

Motor gliders
HWL Pegaz

Helicopters
 Aérospatiale Alouette III
 Bell CH-136 (Canadian Bell OH-58 Kiowa)
 BŻ-1 GIL
 BŻ-4 Żuk
 JK-1 Trzmiel
 Mil Mi-4 A
 Mil Mi-4 ME
 WSK Mi-2 URP
 WSK Mi-2Ch
 WSK SM-1 (licence Mil Mi-1)
 WSK SM-2

Engines

See also
 Culture of Kraków
 List of aerospace museums

References

External links

Official website of the museum (in English and Polish)
Images from the museum collected on www.airliners.net

Aerospace museums in Poland
Museums in Kraków
Transport museums in Poland
Aviation in Poland
Registered museums in Poland
1964 establishments in Poland
Museums established in 1964